Zehrer is a surname. Notable people with the surname include:

Hans Zehrer (1899–1966), German journalist
Joseph Zehrer (born 1954), German artist
Paul Zehrer (born 1963), American film and television director, writer, producer, and editor
Terrence "Lee" Zehrer (born 1947), American businessman
Andreas Zehrer (born 1966), Austrian equestrian